Rail Vikas Nigam Limited is an Indian public sector undertaking which works as the construction arm of the Ministry of Railways for project implementation and transportation infrastructure development. It was incorporated in 2003 to meet the country's surging infrastructural requirements and to implement projects on a fast-track basis. It is a Category-I Miniratna CPSE and Public Sector Undertaking (PSU) under the administrative control of the Indian Ministry of Railways.

The organization undertakes project execution from concept to commissioning and creates project-specific SPVs. RVNL’s mandate includes the mobilization of extra-budgetary resources (EBRs) through a mix of equity and debts via these SPVs.

It is an offshoot of the implementation of National Rail Vikas Yojana (NRVY) announced from the ramparts of the Red Fort by the then Prime Minister, Shree Atal Bihari Vajpayee, during the Independence Day speech on 15 August 2002. NRVY was formally launched by the Hon’ble PM on 26 December 2002 to bridge rail infrastructure deficit. RVNL came into being on 24 January 2003. RVNL initiated its IPO on 29 March 2019 and became listed on 11 April 2019.

RVNL Tagline 
The 3 pillars of RVNL are: Quality, Speed & Transparency.

Completed projects 
The list of 18 projects completed in 2021-22 is as under:

The list of 102 projects fully completed since inception and up to March 2021 is as under:

Projects Under Implementation
There are 72 projects under various stages of implementation by RVNL.

The details of 66 projects assigned to RVNL till March 2021 and which are under implementation are as under:

The list of Railway project assigned to RVNL in 2021-22 and under execution is as under:

The list of projects awarded to RVNL through Competitive Bidding in 2021-22 and under execution is as under:

Special Purpose Vehicles

Kutch Railway Company Ltd 
RVNL owns 50% equity in this project. The project length is 301 km and is for gauge conversion of Palanpur-Gandhidham section. Currently RVNL is doubling Samakhiali-Palanpur (248 km) anticipating increased traffic flow from Mundra and Deendayal Ports.

Bharuch Dahej Railway Co Ltd 
RVNL is the largest stakeholder in this SPV with 35.46% equity. The project length is 63km and is for gauge conversion.

Krishnapatnam Railway Co Ltd 
RVNL is the largest stakeholder in this SPV with 49.76% equity. The project length is 113.2 km and is for construction of new line from Obulaparivalli to Krishnapatnam port. Complete connectivity was provided in June 2019.

Haridaspur Paradip Railway Co Ltd 
RVNL is the largest equity shareholder with 30%. This SPV is for a new 82km line from Haridaspur to Paradip Port. This commercial route became operational on 30.07.2020

Angul Sukinda Railway Ltd 
RVNL is the largest stakeholder in this SPV with 32.16% equity. This is for a new 102.42 km railway line from Angul-Sukinda. 80% of the project has already been completed and the commercial operation will begin shortly.

New SPVs under formation

Indian Port Rail Corporation Limited (IRPCL) 
RVNL is participating in the formation of IRPCL. This is a SPV under the Ministry of Shipping, with the stakeholders being RVNL and 12 major ports. The initial authorised capital of the SPV is Rs 500 crore with RVNL's equity participation being Rs 10 crore only or 10% of the initial subscribed share capital.

The mandate of the SPV is to enhance rail connectivity to the various Ports in the country. This includes maintenance of Port Railways along with up-gradation, modernisation and capacity augmentation as and when required.

Rail connectivity to Rewas Port in Maharashtara 
RVNL began as an organisation for executing various projects of railway engineering, to meet the shortfall of rail infrastructure that the existing system of that time could not fulfil. It was important to think out of the box and find a solution as eventually the price would be heavy with respect to the curtailment of opportunities and options available to a developing nation.

From beginning with railway capacity augmentation through track doubling, new railway lines, gauge conversion, railway electrification, RVNL has moved onto working on metro railways, multimodal transport system, port connectivity, turnkey projects i.e. workshops, training institutes, green buildings, high speed rail projects, cable stayed bridges, river and road bridges, vertical lift bridge, mountain Railways and tunnels.

Corporate Social Responsibility 
Corporate Social Responsibility is a part of the ethos of Rail Vikas Nigam Limited. Aligning its goals to CSR objectives’, RVNL has implemented projects in the thematic areas of Health and Education. The geographic focus of RVNL CSR has been West Bengal, Chhattisgarh, Jharkhand, Uttar Pradesh, Madhya Pradesh, Uttarakhand and Odisha. About 60 per cent of CSR funds are spent in the education & health care sector for the underprivileged, marginalized communities and tribal belts.

Department of Public Enterprises Ratings 
Rail Vikas Nigam Limited has been rated as "Excellent" by the Department of Public Enterprises (DPE) for 11 consecutive years.  The Company has ranked 1st amongst the Railway PSEs and 3rd amongst PSUs in the country in the latest DPE ratings 2020-2021 with a MoU Score of 99.

Recent Accolades 
Rail Vikas Nigam Limited team bagged two awards for excellence by Skoch group viz. Gold award for Public-Private Partnership and Silver award for response to Covid in 2022.

Rail Vikas Nigam Limited was conferred the Roll of Honour as the fastest-growing Mini-Ratna of the year by Dalal Street Investment Journal.

See also
 High Speed Rail Corporation of India Limited, a Special Purpose Vehicle and a subsidiary of Rail Vikas Nigam
 Indian Railway Finance Corporation, non-banking financial corporation financing Indian railways

References

External links 
 Official Site
 RVNL anthem

Rail_Vikas_Nigam_Limited
Rail_Vikas_Nigam_Limited
Indian companies established in 2003
2003 establishments in Delhi
Companies based in Delhi
Companies listed on the National Stock Exchange of India
Companies listed on the Bombay Stock Exchange